Erronea is a genus of sea snails, marine gastropod mollusks in the family Cypraeidae, the cowries.

Species
Species within the genus Erronea include:
 Erronea adusta (Lamarck, 1810)
 Erronea angioyorum Biraghi, 1978
 Erronea caurica (Linnaeus, 1758)
 Erronea cylindrica (Born, 1778)
 Erronea errones (Linnaeus, 1758)
 Erronea fernandoi Cate, 1969
 Erronea garyi Petuch, Berschauer & D. B. Waller, 2019
 Erronea nymphae (Jay, 1850)
 Erronea onyx (Linnaeus, 1758)
 Erronea ovum (Gmelin, 1791)
 Erronea pallida (Gray, 1824)
 Erronea pyriformis (Gray, 1824)
 Erronea rabaulensis  Schilder, 1964
 Erronea subviridis (Reeve, 1835) 
 Erronea vredenburgi  Schilder, 1927
 Erronea xanthodon  (Gray in Sowerby I, 1832)
 Species brought into synonymy
 Erronea angustata (Gmelin, 1791): synonym of Notocypraea angustata (Gmelin, 1791)
 Erronea bealsi Mock, 1996: synonym of Paradusta hungerfordi bealsi (Mock, 1996) (original combination)
 Erronea bregeriana (Crosse, 1868): synonym of Contradusta bregeriana (Crosse, 1868)
 Erronea chinensis (Gmelin, 1791): synonym of Ovatipsa chinensis (Gmelin, 1791)
 Erronea coloba (Melvill, 1888): synonym of Ovatipsa coloba (Melvill, 1888)
 Erronea donghaiensis Ma, 1997: synonym of Paradusta hungerfordi hungerfordi (G. B. Sowerby III, 1888)
 Erronea hungerfordi (Sowerby III, 1888): synonym of Paradusta hungerfordi (G. B. Sowerby III, 1888)
 Erronea japonica Schilder, 1931: synonym of Purpuradusta gracilis notata (Gill, 1858) (synonym)
 Erronea langfordi Kuroda, 1938: synonym of Austrasiatica langfordi (Kuroda, 1938) (original combination)
 Erronea listeri (Gray, 1824): synonym of Melicerona listeri (Gray, 1824)
 Erronea pulchella (Swainson, 1823): synonym of Ficadusta pulchella (Swainson, 1823)
 Erronea succincta (Linnaeus, 1758): synonym of Erronea onyx (Linnaeus, 1758)
 Erronea teramachii Kuroda, 1938: synonym of Nesiocypraea teramachii (Kuroda, 1938) (original combination)
 Erronea walkeri (Sowerby I, 1832): synonym of Contradusta walkeri (G. B. Sowerby I, 1832)
 Erronea weaveri Walls, 1980: synonym of Ficadusta barclayi (Reeve, 1857)

References

External links
 Troschel, F. H. (1856-1893). Das Gebiss der Schnecken zur Begründung einer natürlichen Classification. Nicolaische Verlagsbuchhandlung, Berlin.
 Jousseaume, F. (1884). Division des Cypraeidae. Le Naturaliste. 6(52): 414-415
 Iredale, T. (1930). Queensland molluscan notes, No. 2. Memoirs of the Queensland Museum. 10(1): 73-88, pl. 9
 Iredale, T. (1935). Australian cowries. The Australian Zoologist. 8(2): 96-135, pls 8-9

 
Cypraeidae
Gastropod genera